Pythia Island is an island  long, the largest of a group of small islands off the east side of Enterprise Island in Wilhelmina Bay, off the west coast of Graham Land. Named by the United Kingdom Antarctic Place-Names Committee (UK-APC) in 1960 after Christen Christensen's whaling factory Pythia, which operated from nearby Gouvernoren Harbor during the 1921-22 whaling season.

See also 
 List of Antarctic and sub-Antarctic islands

Islands of Graham Land
Danco Coast